Chameli is a 2004 Indian Hindi-language film. It stars Kareena Kapoor and Rahul Bose, and was directed by Sudhir Mishra. The film was remade as Jabilamma (2008) in Telugu with Navneet Kaur and Rajeev Kanakala in the lead roles. This film otherwise  marked Rinke Khanna's final film after marriage and subsequent retirement from the industry.

Plot 
Aman Kapoor (Rahul Bose) is a wealthy investment banker, whose pregnant wife, Neha (Rinkle Khanna) was killed in a car accident more than a decade ago. The incident has left him depressed and lonely. Forced to engage in social events, he reluctantly hosts a party. The stormy weather puts Aman in a pensive mood, and he decides to go home. While driving, his car breaks down on a flooded road and his cell phone battery dies. He takes refuge in an alleyway where he meets Chameli (Kareena Kapoor), a street-smart prostitute.

Chameli offers Aman a match for his cigarette, and he is initially repulsed by her after she propositions him. Aman's presence scares off a potential customer, and he offers to pay for her missed wages, which Chameli declines. Soon, two police officers arrive, looking for their bribe. They begin to manhandle Chameli, which aggravates Aman, who is then intimidated by the officers. Chameli defuses the situation, and Aman's attitude towards her softens after the pair begin a conversation about their lives. The discussion is interrupted by Johnny, a young boy selling coffee and cigarettes. Chameli is familiar with him, paying his school fees and looking after his health. He promises to come back with a mechanic to fix Aman's car. Chameli then attends to Raja, an unstable young man who has stolen Rs 50,000 from his father. Raja is in love with Haseena, and is convinced that she has run off to become a prostitute. Chameli consoles and advises him, and then takes him away. Haseena, a hijra/trans-woman, arrives and playfully propositions Aman. Chameli returns and advises Haseena to run away with Raja to another city with the money. Raja's homophobic father turns up to look for them, but he leaves soon when he realises they are not there. Each incident further develops the friendship between Chameli and Aman.

Chameli's pimp, Usman, has rented her out to Naik, a brutish local politician who has a reputation for injuring prostitutes. Naik's henchmen seek Chameli out, and the pair manage to escape and go to a local bar, to talk to Usman. Chameli reveals that she cannot free herself from her pimp because she still owes him money which she borrowed. At the bar, Aman offers to pay off Chameli's debt in exchange for her not having to entertain Naik. At the ATM Usman demands more money, threatening Aman with a knife, and the pimp is stabbed in the ensuing scuffle. Aman and Chameli are picked up by the police, and his temperament causes him to be placed in a holding cell. Chameli convinces the officers to allow Aman to make a call, and he speaks to a friend who has connections with the Assistant Commissioner of Police K.P. Singh. Singh listens to Aman's story and decides to withdraw the police protection over Usman, who previously became an informant after being arrested. Chameli tells Aman that the withdrawal of protection means that Usman and his family are now vulnerable to being killed by other, more dangerous criminals. Singh reluctantly agrees to continue protecting Usman. At the hospital, Singh forces Usman to call Naik, and the ACP threatens him, eventually convincing Naik to leave Chameli alone.

As they leave the hospital, Chameli playfully teases Aman about how his wife will react to the situation. Aman breaks down and tells her about the accident, adding that it is his fault that Neha died since he chose to drive in heavy rains. As dawn breaks on the next day, Aman finally returns home, a changed man. The highly eventful night has altered his outlook on life and allowed him to come to terms with his loss. He reconnects with his father-in-law, whom he had avoided since his wife's death. After some time, he returns to see Chameli, and they meet again.

Cast 
 Kareena Kapoor as Chameli
 Rahul Bose as Aman Kapoor
 Rinke Khanna as Neha Kapoor
 Shahil Raichand 
 Yashpal Sharma as K.P. Singh
 Satyajit Sharma as Police Inspector 
 Pankaj Jha as Usman Bilal
 Kabir Sadanand as Haseena Khan
 Makrand Deshpande as Taxi driver
 Tarun Shukla as Corporator's man
 Mahek Chahal (special performance in "Sajana ve Sajana")

Production 
Chameli was first offered to actress Amisha Patel who then refused to do the film and said the role of prostitute won't match her character. Then the role went to Kareena Kapoor, which marked a turning point in her career. The film began production in August of 2003. The director of the film, Anant Balani, died on 28 August 2003. The film was almost shelved when Pritish Nandy, the producer, called Sudhir Mishra to complete the film. Mishra completed the film with a different script.

Soundtrack 

Songs composed by Sandesh Shandilya and lyrics are penned by Irshad Kamil and Prof. R. N. Dubey.

Reception 
Anupama Chopra wrote that ", he [Sudhir Mishra] takes the late director Anant Balani's idea of a one-night encounter between a prostitute and an investment banker and creates a poignant portrait of urban lives. Taran Adarsh wrote that "On the whole, CHAMELI does not deliver. At the box-office, the film caters to a niche audience but in view of the fact that the film lacks a solid script to keep the viewer hooked, even that segment of viewers may not take to it whole-heartedly". A critic from Outlook wrote that "There is a good vibe between Bose and Kareena that makes the movie watchable". A critic from Deccan Herald wrote that "But be warned — high expectations will be shattered".

Awards 
Asian Festival of First Films
Swarovski Trophy - Best Cinematography - Aseem Bajaj

Filmfare Awards
Best Cinematography - Aseem Bajaj
Special Award for Best Performance - Kareena Kapoor

IIFA Awards
 Best Cinematography - Aseem Bajaj

References

External links 
 
 

2004 films
2000s Hindi-language films
Films about prostitution in India
Films set in Mumbai
Films scored by Sandesh Shandilya
Indian pregnancy films
Films directed by Anant Balani
Films directed by Sudhir Mishra
Hindi films remade in other languages